José Manuel Ochotorena Santacruz (born 16 January 1961) is a Spanish former footballer who played as a goalkeeper.

Playing career
Born in San Sebastián, Gipuzkoa, Ochotorena emerged through Real Madrid's youth ranks, making his professional debut late in the 1981–82 season due to a professional's strike as he was still part of the reserve squad setup. He would have to wait until 1985–86 to become a starter, helping the capital side to that year's La Liga and UEFA Cup titles, but lost his spot the following campaign after the signing of Sevilla FC's Francisco Buyo.

Afterwards, Ochotorena moved to Valencia CF, winning the Ricardo Zamora Trophy in his first year, being replaced mere minutes into the last match at Real Madrid which helped him maintain his average. After three solid seasons at the Mestalla Stadium, he was sent off in a game against the same opponent, and never appeared officially for the Che again. On 17 September 1989, he was in goal in a 6–2 loss to his previous employer.

Ochotorena retired in 1998 at the age of 37, after unassuming spells with CD Tenerife, CD Logroñés (he played most of the matches in 1994–95, but the Riojans were relegated) and Racing de Santander. He earned one cap for Spain, taking the place of Andoni Zubizarreta for the final ten minutes of a friendly against Poland in A Coruña on 20 September 1989, and was in the final squad for the 1990 FIFA World Cup.

Coaching career
After retiring, Ochotorena assumed goalkeeping coach duties at both Valencia and the Spanish national team. When his compatriot Rafael Benítez joined Premier League club Liverpool in July 2004, he replaced Joe Corrigan.

Ochotorena returned to Valencia once again in the summer of 2007, being replaced at Liverpool by Xavi Valero. He also continued to work with Spain.

References

External links

CiberChe biography and stats 

1961 births
Living people
Spanish footballers
Footballers from San Sebastián
Association football goalkeepers
La Liga players
Segunda División players
Real Madrid Castilla footballers
Real Madrid CF players
Valencia CF players
CD Tenerife players
CD Logroñés footballers
Racing de Santander players
UEFA Cup winning players
Spain international footballers
1990 FIFA World Cup players
Liverpool F.C. non-playing staff
Spanish expatriate sportspeople in England
Valencia CF non-playing staff